David John Comer (26 July 1956 – 25 December 2014) was a New Zealand still photographer. He was the location scout for The Lord of the Rings and The Hobbit film series.

Early life
Comer was born in Dunedin. He studied photography and fine arts at the University of Canterbury. He worked for some time in the Fiordland region as a wilderness guide and in the jet boating industry.

Work in advertising
Comer's early career involved shooting stills for commercials in the 1980s and 90s. Of note is his advertisement for the Jaguar car company in 2000, in which he was credited with developing a technique to convert still frames to motion picture film, creating a dream-like effect with the car crisp and in-focus and the background motion blurred. The advertisement won the Kodak AICP Award for Cinematography in New York City, and the commercial was added to the permanent collection of the New York Museum of Modern Art.

Comer died of cancer in 2014.

References

External links
 

1956 births
2014 deaths
Deaths from cancer in New Zealand
Artists from Dunedin
University of Canterbury alumni
Film location scouts
New Zealand photographers
New Zealand film people